Peltotrupes is a genus of earth-boring scarab beetles in the family Geotrupidae. There are at least two described species in Peltotrupes.

Species
These two species belong to the genus Peltotrupes:
 Peltotrupes profundus (Howden, 1952) (Florida deepdigger scarab)
 Peltotrupes youngi Howden, 1955 (Young's deepdigger scarab)

References

Further reading

 
 

Geotrupidae
Articles created by Qbugbot